In Nordic mythology, Blóðughófi (Old Norse: , "Bloody Hoof", sometimes anglicised Blodughofi) is the horse of Freyr and is attested in several þulur of horses.

Attestations

Kálfsvísa
In Kálfsvísa, Blóðughófi is named in a list of horses, where their rider is specified as the "Slayer of Beli", a name for Freyr:

Þorgrímsþula
In Þorgrímsþula, Blóðughófi is named among a list of horses:

Here, they are described as being ridden by "", sometimes interpreted as a name of Freyr, however the closely related spelling  is used as a named of Odin.

Anonymous þulur
In one of the anonymous þulur, Blóðughófi is named in a list of horses, as the variant,  (Blood-hoof):

Interpretation and discussion
In Skírnismál, Freyr gives Skírnir his horse, which is able to run through fire to reach Jötunheimar for the wooing of Gerðr, however, the horse here is not named.

The association between horses and Freyr is also seen in texts such as Hrafnkels saga, Vatnsdæla saga and Óláfs saga Tryggvasonar where horses are dedicated to the god, however it has been noted that these sources are late and could be unreliable on this aspect.

Popular culture
The title of Gerður Kristný's Blóðhófnir (2010), a poetic retelling of the myth of Gerðr, Freyr, and Skírnir, is a variation on the name Blóðughófi.

See also
 Gullinbursti - boar also ridden by Freyr
 Sleipnir - horse ridden by Odin
 Uchchaihshravas - horse ridden by Indra

References

Bibliography

Primary

Secondary
 
 

Freyr
Horses in Norse mythology